Amanda Kolczynski (born 10 August 1993) is a French handballer for Saint-Amand Handball and the France national team.

Individual awards 
 All-Star Right Wing of the Championnat de France: 2016
French Championship Best Right Wing: 2016

References

1993 births
Living people
Sportspeople from Angers
French female handball players
21st-century French women